Eze Nri Ìfikuánim was the first king of the Nri Kingdom. According to Igbo oral tradition, his reign started in 1043, although at least one historian puts Ìfikuánim's reign much later, around 1225 AD.

References

Nri-Igbo
Nri monarchs
Kingdom of Nri
11th-century monarchs in Africa
12th-century monarchs in Africa